The Bedford Branch was a rail line owned and operated by the Pennsylvania Railroad in the U.S. state of Pennsylvania.

The line ran from the Morrisons Cove Branch at Brookes Mills south via Bedford to the Maryland state line. The PRR had trackage rights south to Cumberland over the Western Maryland Railway's State Line Branch. Only the line from Brookes Mills south to Sproul is still in use, as a line of the Everett Railroad.

History
The Bedford and Bridgeport Railroad opened from the state line north via Bedford to Mount Dallas (at the Huntingdon and Broad Top Mountain Railroad and Coal Company) in 1871; the Cumberland and Pennsylvania Railroad built a connecting branch in Maryland. The Dunnings Creek Branch, later part of the main line, opened from Dunnings Creek Junction (near Bedford) north, through Cessna, to ore mines at Holderbaum in 1873. The Pennsylvania Railroad in Maryland was chartered in 1876 to build an independent connection from the state line to Cumberland. The road opened in 1879 and in 1888 was merged into the Georges Creek and Cumberland Railroad and later became part of the Western Maryland Railway.

In 1891, the Bedford and Hollidaysburg Railroad opened an extension from Cessna north to near Imler, and completed the line to Brookes Mills in 1910. This connected it to the rest of the PRR system via the Morrisons Cove Branch; it had formerly only been connected via the Huntingdon and Broad Top Mountain Railroad and Coal Company.

Infrastructure 
Two editions of the Pennsylvania Railroad's CT 1000, Lists of Stations and Sidings and Instructions for Making Reports to the Superintendent Car Service, (1923, 1945) serve as the basic guide for the line.

Brookes Mills, Pa to Dunning's Creek Junction, Pa

Mt. Dallas Branch, Pa

Dunning's Creek Junction, Pa to Cumberland, Md

References

Transportation in Cumberland, MD-WV-PA
Pennsylvania Railroad lines
Rail infrastructure in Pennsylvania
Closed railway lines in the United States